The 1992 German motorcycle Grand Prix was the seventh round of the 1992 Grand Prix motorcycle racing season. It took place on the weekend of 12–14 June 1992, at the Hockenheim circuit.

500cc race
Wayne Rainey took a big highside in qualifying and crashed, breaking his ribs, wrist and injuring his knee, but decided to race anyway. "Mentally I was down, probably the worst I had ever been in my GP career. I’d screwed myself up trying to race with Doohan. And I didn’t feel I was getting the support from Yamaha. I was still on the same bike, it was still slow."

Mick Doohan was on pole. John Kocinski took the lead at the start but gave it up to Doohan quickly. Doohan got a gap to Kevin Schwantz, then the rest followed. Rainey retired from the race: "I ended up pulling in, for the first time in my career, because I was just too hurt to continue. ... I knew anything could happen, but the only thing for me would be if Mick made a huge mistake. That was possible because I knew he only thought about being the fastest guy, winning every race and devastating everybody."

The fight for third between Àlex Crivillé, Wayne Gardner and Kocinski went to experience over youth.

500 cc classification

References

German motorcycle Grand Prix
German
Motorcycle